The City Slicker is a 1918 American short comedy film featuring Harold Lloyd. Prints of the film survive in the film archive of the Library of Congress.

Plot
Harold arrives in the backward town of Punkville by train to answer a classified ad offering employment for an eager young man who can modernize an antiquated hotel.  Within a short time Harold has modernized the inn, including having rooms where the furniture. beds, telephones and bathtubs emerge from the walls.  Bebe arrives at the hotel accompanied by her somewhat overbearing mother.  Harold is attracted to her and helps her thwart and unwanted and much older suitor.

Cast
 Harold Lloyd as Harold
 Snub Pollard as Snub (as Harry Pollard)
 Bebe Daniels as The Girl
 Helen Gilmore as Girl's Mother
 William Blaisdell as Bebe's rejected suitor
 Gus Alexander
 Sammy Brooks
 Lige Conley (as Lige Cromley)
 Billy Fay
 William Gillespie
 Wallace Howe
 Dee Lampton as Driver
 Gus Leonard as Old man playing checkers
 Charles Stevenson (as Charles E. Stevenson)

See also
 List of American films of 1918
 Harold Lloyd filmography

References

External links

 The City Slicker on YouTube

1918 films
Silent American comedy films
American silent short films
American black-and-white films
Films directed by Gilbert Pratt
1918 comedy films
1918 short films
American comedy short films
Surviving American silent films
1910s American films
1910s English-language films